The Toyota Pro/Celebrity Race was an annual 10-lap auto race held each April since 1977 until 2016 as part of the United States Grand Prix West, and later the Toyota Grand Prix of Long Beach weekend at Long Beach, California. Beginning in 1991, the event raised money for "Racing for Kids," a national fund-raising program benefiting children's hospitals in Long Beach and Orange County.

The TPCR pitted celebrities against professional racers from various types of motor racing. They raced in identically prepared cars built by Toyota or Toyota owned Scion.  From its inception until 2005, the drivers drove showroom stock Toyota Celicas.  Scion tCs were used from 2006 to 2012, and the Scion FR-S began use in 2013. Celebrity contestants ranged from Hollywood's "A-list" elite, budding young stars and starlets, professional sports figures, local Southern California television and radio personalities and selected Toyota dealers. One seat was put up for auction, the high bidder for which also participated in the race. Often, a member of the broadcast team for the feature race would race in the event; Ken Squier, Paul Page, Jack Arute, and Jamie Little (the 2008 winner) have all participated in the race while broadcasting the feature.

All celebrities were given thorough practice, safety, and training sessions before competing, and no serious injuries occurred, despite a large number of crashes throughout the years. Several celebrities who have taken part in the TPCR have gone on to take up auto racing as a part-time hobby or as team owners.

The celebrities received a 30-second head start to begin the race against the professionals and past champions. In 2015, actor Alfonso Ribeiro won while classed as a pro (thus starting with a 30-second handicap) and thereby became the third driver to have won the event in both "celebrity" and "pro" classifications, after Adam Carolla in 2013 and Sean Patrick Flanery in 1997/1998.

On March 11, 2016 it was announced that the 2016 running of the event would be the final event due to Toyota moving its headquarters from nearby Torrance to Texas.

Winners

* = overall champion

*- = winner has changed their name since winning race. Their name shown is their current name.

  James (1978) and Josh (2000) Brolin is the only father-son combination to win the celebrity portion of the event. However, Josh had the distinction of being an overall winner, unlike his father. 
  The Unsers and the Jones' are the only father-son combination to win the Pro portion of the event, with Parnelli Jones winning multiple times.
  Paul Moyer, at the time of his 1988 win, was a news anchor with KABC-TV in Los Angeles.
  After Amato's win, Grand Prix officials required NHRA drag racers to race as professionals.
  After Alfonso Ribeiro won two consecutive races, TGPLB rules required past celebrity winners must race as professionals.
  For the 20th Anniversary race in 1996, there were no professional drivers.
  Tom Rudnai is general manager of a local Toyota dealership
 Three times, the play-by-play announcer for the main event was in the Pro/Celebrity race – Paul Page twice (once raced against his own pit reporter, Jack Arute), and Ken Squier in the early years, when it was the United States Grand Prix West.

Notes

References

External links
All-time statistics at Toyota.com Includes a complete listing of everyone who has ever competed in the event.
Photos of practice sessions for the 2005 race

1977 establishments in California
Celebrity competitions
Grand Prix of Long Beach
One-make series
Recurring sporting events established in 1977
Touring car races
Pro Celebrity Race
2016 disestablishments in California
Recurring sporting events disestablished in 2016